Canoeing at the 2007 Pan American Games took place at the Lagoa Rodrigo de Freitas, the same venue that hosted the Rowing and Water Skiing. Although the initial intention of the Organizing Committee was to have the whole Olympic program at the Pan American Games, the slalom competitions were abandoned due to the few number of probable participating countries.

The competition in Flatwater Racing comprised the twelve Olympic Events. In the 2003 Pan American Games, Cuba lead the medal tally with five gold medals, with the United States in second (three golds, one silver and one bronze) and Argentina and Canada tied in third with two golds, two silvers and three bronzes.

The 1.000m events' heats and semifinals took place on July 26 and the heats and semifinals of the 500m events on July 27. The 1.000m finals (and the Women's K-4 500m final) were held on July 27 and the other 500m finals on July 28.

Medal table

Medalists

Men's events

Women's events

References
sports123

Pan American Games
2007
Pan American Games
Events at the 2007 Pan American Games
Canoeing and kayaking competitions in Brazil